Transition metal alkyl complexes are coordination complexes that contain a bond between a transition metal and an alkyl ligand. Such complexes are not only pervasive but are of practical and theoretical interest.

Scope 
Most metal alkyl complexes contain other, non-alkyl ligands.  Great interest, mainly theoretical, has focused on the homoleptic complexes.  Indeed, the first reported example of a complex containing a metal-sp3 carbon bond was the homoleptic complex diethylzinc.  Other examples include hexamethyltungsten, tetramethyltitanium, and tetranorbornylcobalt.

Mixed ligand, or heteroleptic, complexes containing alkyls are numerous.  In nature, vitamin B12 and its many derivatives contain reactive Co-alkyl bonds.

Preparation
Metal alkyl complexes are prepared generally by two pathways, use of alkyl nucleophiles and use of alkyl electrophiles. Nucleophilic sources of alkyl ligands include Grignard reagents and organolithium compounds.  Since many strong nucleophiles are also potent reductants, mildly nucleophilic alkylating agents are sometimes employed to avoid redox reactions.  Organozinc compounds and organoaluminium compounds are such milder reagents.

Electrophilic alkylation commonly starts with low valence metal complexes.  Typical electrophilic reagents are alkyl halides.  Illustrative is the preparation of the methyl derivative of cyclopentadienyliron dicarbonyl anion:
CpFe(CO)2Na  +  CH3I  →  CpFe(CO)2CH3  +  NaI

Many metal alkyls are prepared by oxidative addition:  

An example is the reaction of a Vaska's complex with methyl iodide.

Agostic interactions and beta-hydride elimination
Some metal alkyls feature agostic interactions between a C-H bond on the alkyl group and the metal.  Such interactions are especially common for complexes of early transition metals in their highest oxidation states.

One determinant of the kinetic stability of metal-alkyl complexes is the presence of hydrogen at the position beta to the metal.  If such hydrogens are present and if the metal center is coordinatively unsaturated, then the complex can undergo beta-hydride elimination to form a metal-alkene complex:

These conversions are assumed to proceed via the intermediacy of agostic interactions.

Catalysis
Many homogeneous catalysts operate via the intermediacy of metal alkyls.  These reactions include hydrogenation, hydroformylation, alkene isomerization, and olefin polymerization.  It is assumed that the corresponding heterogeneous reactions also involve metal-alkyl bonds.

References

Coordination chemistry
Organometallic chemistry